Northgate is a suburb in the inner north-east of Adelaide, South Australia. It is approximately a 10-minute drive from the Adelaide City Council.

Until March 2016, Northgate also included a significant portion of what is now Lightsview.

Places of interest
 Cedar College

Shopping
The Northgate Village Shopping Centre is located on the corner of Fosters Road and Folland Avenue and contains a Woolworths supermarket and some specialty stores.

Transport
Main roads within Northgate which are major public transport routes are:
 Grand Junction Road: Routes 237 and 361
 Fosters Road: Routes 204, 208 and 528

Main North Road and Hampstead Road are major arterial roads, in very close proximity to Northgate, with both having bus services supplying those roads.

The O-Bahn Busway is also close to Northgate, with Adelaide Metro providing a bus service that links the Adelaide city centre, the O-Bahn and Northgate.

The Northfield railway line was located nearby but was closed in 1987.

See also
List of Adelaide suburbs

References

External links

City of Port Adelaide Enfield

Suburbs of Adelaide